The list of shipwrecks in February 1865 includes ships sunk, foundered, wrecked, grounded, or otherwise lost during February 1865.

1 February

2 February

3 February

4 February

5 February

6 February

7 February

8 February

9 February

10 February

24 February

25 February

26 February

27 February

28 February

Unknown date

References

Notes

Bibliography
 Gaines, W. Craig, Encyclopedia of Civil War Shipwrecks, Louisiana State University Press, 2008 , .
 Ingram, C. W. N., and Wheatley, P. O., (1936) Shipwrecks: New Zealand disasters 1795–1936. Dunedin, NZ: Dunedin Book Publishing Association.

1865-02
Maritime incidents in February 1865